Michelle Tong (born 25 January 1997) is a Canadian badminton player. She won the women's doubles gold medals at the 2016 and 2017 Pan Am Championships. Tong was part of the Canadian winning team at the 2016 and 2017 Pan Am Mixed Team Championships, and also at the 2018 Pan Am Women's Team Championships.

Achievements

Pan Am Championships 
Women's doubles

References

External links 
 

1997 births
Living people
People from Singapore
Canadian people of Singaporean descent
Sportspeople from Markham, Ontario
Canadian female badminton players